Drummond is a former provincial electoral riding in the Centre-du-Québec region of Quebec, Canada, which elected members to the National Assembly of Quebec. As of its final election, it consisted of most of the city of Drummondville and all of Saint-Edmond-de-Grantham, Saint-Eugène, Saint-Germain-de-Grantham and Saint-Majorique-de-Grantham.

It was created for the 1890 election from parts of the former Drummond-Arthabaska electoral district.  Its final election was in 2008.  It disappeared in the 2012 election and its successor electoral districts were Drummond–Bois-Francs and Johnson.

The riding as well as the city of Drummondville were named in honor of former War of 1812 general Gordon Drummond.

Members of the Legislative Assembly / National Assembly
 William John Watts, Liberal (1890–1892)
 Joseph Peter Cooke, Conservative Party (1892–1897)
 William John Watts, Liberal (1897–1901)
 Joseph Laferté, Liberal (1901–1909)
 Louis-Jules Allard, Liberal (1910–1916)
 Hector Laferté, Liberal (1916–1935)
 Arthur Rajotte, Liberal (1935–1936)
 Joseph Marier, Union Nationale (1936–1939)
 Arthur Rajotte, Liberal (1939–1944)
 Robert Bernard, Union Nationale (1944–1952)
 Bernard Pinard, Liberal (1952–1956)
 Robert Bernard, Union Nationale (1956–1960)
 Bernard Pinard, Liberal (1960–1973)
 Robert Malouin, Liberal (1973–1976)
 Michel Clair, Parti Québécois (1976–1985)
 Jean-Guy St-Roch, Liberal (1985–1994)
 Normand Jutras, Parti Québécois (1994–2007)
 Sébastien Schneeberger, ADQ (2007–2008)
 Yves-François Blanchet, Parti Québécois (2008–2012)

Election results

|-
 
|Liberal
|Jacques Sigouin
|align="right"|10,860
|align="right"|32.54
|align="right"|

|}

References

External links
Information
 Elections Quebec

Election results
 Election results (National Assembly)
 Election results (Elections Quebec)

Maps
 2001 map (Flash)
2001–2011 changes (Flash)
1992–2001 changes (Flash)
 Electoral map of Centre-du-Québec region (as of 2001)
 Quebec electoral map, 2001

Drummondville
Former provincial electoral districts of Quebec